In 2018, U.S. states proposed or are expected to propose cannabis reform legislation for medical marijuana and non-medical adult use. State-level legalization remains at odds with cannabis' status as a Schedule I narcotic under the Controlled Substances Act at the Federal level, and the Cannabis policy of the Donald Trump administration appeared to become more hostile than that of the previous administration, with the early January rescission of the Cole Memorandum.

States expected to be most likely to propose legislation to fully legalize include Michigan, New Hampshire, New Jersey, and Rhode Island. Other possible full legalization states include Connecticut, Delaware, and Ohio; medical marijuana proposals were under way or expected in Oklahoma, Kentucky, South Dakota, and Utah.

Federal
In the House of Representatives, Democratic Representatives Barbara Lee of California and  Representative Ro Khanna, of the same state, introduced the Marijuana Justice Act, the counterpart of a Senate Bill 1689 which was introduced in 2017 by Senator Cory Booker.

A bipartisan bill, the Sensible Enforcement Of Cannabis Act, was introduced in February.

In late March, Senate Majority Leader Mitch McConnell announced he would introduce the Hemp Farming Act of 2018. It would expand the experimental hemp production allowed under the 2014 farm bill, removing hemp from Schedule I controlled substances and making it an ordinary agricultural commodity. He introduced the bill on the Senate floor on April 12.

On April 11, President Donald Trump told Senator Cory Gardner of Colorado that he would "support congressional efforts to protect states that have legalized marijuana". A bill to resolve the state-Federal conflict was still "a work in progress" but seemed to a Colorado cannabis industry group be implicit in Gardner's comments afterwards. California Senator Dianne Feinstein made a surprising reversal of her prior stance against state or federal legalization in May and said she was "open to  supporting" the Gardner bill. Gardner and Senator Elizabeth Warren introduced the STATES Act in June to apply Federal prohibition only in states that did not have state-level legalization.

State
In summary, Vermont passed legislation legalizing cannabis statewide in January, the first time legalization occurred via legislature, not initiative. Utah legalized medical cannabis without THC restrictions for some patients in March. Industrial hemp laws were passed in Alaska, Kansas and Oklahoma in April, and a New Mexico Supreme Court decision ordered the promulgation of a 2017 hemp bill. Oklahoma legalized medical cannabis in June.

Territory
The CNMI Cannabis Act of 2018 was introduced to the Northern Mariana Islands Commonwealth Legislature in 2017, and was passed by the Senate in May, 2018.

References

External links
Marijuana on the ballot at Ballotpedia

Cannabis reform proposals 2018
Cannabis reform 2018

2018 United States
Reform proposals 2018